Háromfa is a village in Somogy county, Hungary.

Etymology
The village was earlier called Háromfafalva which got shortened to Háromfa. The earlier seal and its coat of arms also have three poplars.

External links 
 Street map (Hungarian)

References 

Populated places in Somogy County
Hungarian German communities in Somogy County
Hungarian Slovene communities in Somogy County